Teknik på farfars tid is a privately owned museum dedicated to technology of the early 20th century in Helsingborg, Sweden. The museum was founded by Bengt Strand in 1970, and contains thousands of items: from veteran cars and motorcycles, to radios and toys. Bengt Strand received the Cultural Award of Helsingborg in 1989.

External links

  (in Swedish)
 Cars at Helsingborg technical museum

Museums in Skåne County
Helsingborg
Automobile museums in Sweden
History museums in Sweden